Carmelo Alonso Bernaola (16 July 1929 5 June 2002) was a Spanish composer and clarinetist from Basque Country. A member of the Generation of '51, he was one of the most influential composers in the Spanish musical scene of the second half of the 20th century.

Early years
Bernaola was born in Otxandio, Biscay, Spain. His father was Amado Alonso and his mother was Rufina Bernaola. He later chose to use his mother's surname, rather than his father's. When he was 7 years old, he and his family moved to Medina de Pomar (Burgos), where he received his first musical education. In 1943 he moved to the city of Burgos, where he studied with professor Blanco and he also played the clarinet with the local Engineers Academy Band.

In 1951 he obtained a job as clarinetist with the Army Ministry Band and he moved to Madrid. In Madrid Conservatory he studied counterpoint, fugue and composition with Massó, Calés Pina and Julio Gómez. In 1953 he got a new job as clarinetist with the Madrid City Band, but in 1959 he obtained the Prix de Rome and moved to Italy.

In Italy he studied composition with Goffredo Petrassi in the Accademia Nazionale di Santa Cecilia and conducting with Sergiu Celibidache in the Accademia Chigiana di Siena. In addition, during this period he participated in the Darmstadt International Summer Courses under the direction of Bruno Maderna and Olivier Messiaen and there he met Pierre Boulez, Karlheinz Stockhausen, Luigi Nono and Ramón Barce. In Spain, he completed his studies with André Jolivet and Alexander Tansman in Santiago de Compostela.

Maturity 
In 1962 he returned to Madrid, where he is harmony teacher in Madrid Conservatory and clarinet player with the City Band. He was also a scholar at Valladolid University.

From 1981 until his retirement he was the director of the Conservatory of Vitoria-Gasteiz. He died in Madrid at the age of 72.

Works 
In addition to the works indicated in this list, he composed the music for several plays, films and TV shows, though regarded these "functional" compositions as distinct from his "real" catalogue of vocal and instrumental works. He is also the author or arranger of several popular songs (like the anthem of Athletic Bilbao).

1955: Trío-Sonatina (for oboe, clarinet and bassoon); Capricho (for clarinet and piano); Music for wind quintet.
1956: Three piano pieces.
1957: Suite-divertimento (piano and orchestra); Homenaje a Scarlatti (piano and orchestra); String Quartet No.1.
1958: Canción y danza (piano).
1959: Cuatro piezas infantiles (piano).
1960: Píccolo Concerto (violin and string ensemble); Constantes (voice, 3 clarinets and percussion).
1961: Superficie número 1 (chamber ensemble); Sinfonetta Progresiva (string ensemble).
1962: Espacios variados; Superficie número 2 (violoncello).
1963: Permutado (violin and guitar); Superficie número 4; Morfología sonora (piano).
1964: Mixturas.
1965: Heterofonías.
1966: Episodio (bass); Traza.
1967: Músicas de cámara.
1968: Continuo (piano).
1969: Polifonías.
1970: Oda für Marisa.
1971: Relatividades.
1972: Impulsos; Argia ezta ikusten.
1974: Sinfonía en do; Negaciones de San Pedro (bass and choir); Presencia (string quartet and piano); Per due.
1976: Superposiciones variables.; Así; Tiempos (violoncello and piano); Pieza I.
1977: Achode (clarinet quintet).
1978: Villanesca; Entrada; Juegos.
1979: A mi aire; Qué familia; Superficie número 5 (double bass).
1980: Variantes combinadas (chamber ensemble); Symphony No.2.; Galatea, Rocinante y Preciosa; Koankinteto; Variantes combinadas.
1981: Béla Bartók I; Tres piezas.
1984: Las siete palabras de Cristo en la Cruz.
1985: Variaciones concertantes (Espacios variados número 2).
1986: Nostálgico (piano and orchestra).
1987: Perpétuo, cántico, final (piano).
1988: El retablillo de Don Cristóbal; Per a Fréderic (trio).
1989: La Celestina.
1990: Symphony Nº 3.
1992: Scherzo.
2001: Fantasías.

Selected filmography
 The Wild Ones of San Gil Bridge (1966)
 Love and Other Solitudes (1969)
 A House Without Boundaries (1972)
 Gone to the Mountain (1974)
 Count Dracula's Great Love (1974)
 Sex o no sex (1974)
 Pim, pam, pum... ¡fuego! (1975)

References

Further reading
 Santata, Amaia. 2012. "Réquiem por dos maestros: El mes de junio deja atrás el décimo aniversario de la muerte de Escudero y Bernaola" Deia: Noticias de Bizkaia (1 July). (Retrieved 20 November 2012).

1929 births
2002 deaths
Spanish male composers
People from Durangaldea
20th-century Spanish composers
Spanish clarinetists
Madrid Royal Conservatory alumni
People from the Province of Burgos
Accademia Nazionale di Santa Cecilia alumni
Spanish expatriates in Italy
Basque composers